Mirza Reza Kalhor (born 1829 – died 1892) was a 19th-century Iranian calligrapher of Kurdish origin, known for his mastery of the Nastaʿlīq script technique.

A member of the Kalhor tribe of Kermanshah, he initially followed the typical tribal path, learning horsemanship and sharpshooting. He gained an interest in calligraphy as a child, and left the tribe for further training. During his career, he introduced several innovations to Nastaʿlīq calligraphy, changing both the aesthetics and mechanics of the technique.

Kalhor modified and adapted Nastaʿlīq to be easily used with printing machines and newspaper lithography, which in turn helped wide dissemination of his transcripts. He also devised methods for teaching Nastaʿlīq and specified clear proportional rules for it, which many could follow.

He died of cholera in Tehran at age 65, having sired nine children and taught many calligraphy students, several of whom went on to become notable in their own right. He was buried in Ḥasanābād cemetery.

References

1829 births
1892 deaths
Iranian calligraphers
19th-century Iranian artists
Iranian Kurdish people
People of Qajar Iran